Barbie Smith is an American former competitive figure skater. She won the silver medal in ladies' singles at the 1977 U.S. Figure Skating Championships and finished fourth at the World Figure Skating Championships that year.

Life
In February 1977 she competed in Hartford, Conn in the U.S. Figure Skating Championships and she was a favourite.

Although Linda Fratianne had become the first female skater to land two different types of triple jumps (toe loop and Salchow) in her free skating programs in 1976 at the U.S. National Championships. She might have been beaten by Barbie Smith who landed a triple, but Carroll was aware of her abilities, and he required that Fratiianne should land two triples. This pushed Smith into second place and Fratianne took the gold.

She finished fourth at the World Figure Skating Championships that year.

Results

References

Living people
Year of birth missing (living people)
American female single skaters